Mike Valerio is a writer, producer, director, and executive in the entertainment industry for over 20 years.  Valerio has worked on over a hundred TV shows, films, documentaries, and mini-series and over a dozen television networks and entertainment companies.  Valerio is most famous for his 1999 film Carlo's Wake.

Filmography (partial) 
 Alison Mathews: Art Matters –  (2008) (Short Documentary) (Writer-director-Producer)
 Quantum Hoops – (2007) (Documentary film) (Creative consultant)
 My Network TV Premiere Special – (2006) (TV movie) (Writer-Consulting producer)
 NBC Premiere Week Preview – (2005) (TV) (Writer-director)
 Carlo's Wake – (1999) (Feature film) (Screenwriter-director)
 Stealth Force – (1993) (Unproduced film) (Screenwriter)
 King B: A Life in the Movies – (1993) (Documentary film) (Writer-director-Producer)

Carlo's Wake (1999) (feature film) 
Carlo's Wake, is an independent black comedy starring Academy Award winners Martin Landau and Rita Moreno.  The film also stars actress/ writer Rosie Taravella who wrote the play "Pa's Funeral" on which Carlo's Wake is based.  Taravella and Valerio co-wrote the screenplay together and were later married in 1994.

Carlo's Wake, Valerio's first feature film and was received with critical success. Valerio and Taravella divorced in 2004.

Education and background 
Valerio graduated from Rhode Island College in 1980 and began his career as producer of PM Magazine in Providence, Rhode Island at WJAR-TV. Valerio has since worked as a writer/ director/ producer & creative executive at companies including NBC, CBS, ABC, Warner Bros., Fox, Disney, Telepictures, and ABC Family. Mike Valerio died due to heart failure on March 17, 2010.

Entertainment executive 
Valerio has held many executive positions at various production and entertainment companies.

 director of Special Projects and [Comedy] Programs, NBC
 Executive director of Creative Services, Telepictures Prods.
 Vice President of Special Projects, Fox Broadcasting
 director of Filmmaking#Development, Jay Silverman Productions

References 

American television directors
American television producers
American film directors
American film producers
Living people
Year of birth missing (living people)